Margaret "Maggie" Shea (born July 13, 1989) is an American sailor who is a Pan American Games medallist and a two-time medallist in the World Championships.

Career
After graduating from Connecticut College, Shea dedicated herself to professional sports, being one of the founders of the Epic Racing team, in the Match Race category. As a member of the team, she won a bronze medal at the 2014 World Championships.

In 2019, Shea won the silver medal at the Pan American Games, in the 49er FX class. Her partner was her compatriot Stephanie Roble. The team was defeated by the Brazilian Olympic champion duo, Martine Grael and Kahena Kunze, who won nine of the twelve races. Much more balanced was against Argentina's Victoria Travascio and María Sol Branz, which ended with an advantage of one point less lost to the Americans after the Argentines were disqualified from the medal race.

In 2020, Shea won her first major result at the international level, the bronze medal in the 49er & 49er FX World Championships of the 49er FX class, in Geelong, Australia. With this result, she and her partner Roble earned the right to represent the United States at the 2020 Summer Olympics in Tokyo.

References

External links
 
 
 
 

1989 births
Living people
People from Wilmette, Illinois
American female sailors (sport)
Olympic sailors of the United States
Sailors at the 2020 Summer Olympics – 49er FX
Pan American Games medalists in sailing
21st-century American women
Medalists at the 2019 Pan American Games
Pan American Games silver medalists for the United States